Syndecan-3 is a protein that in humans is encoded by the SDC3 gene.

References

Further reading